State Fair Coliseum may refer to:

Oklahoma State Fair Arena, formerly known as State Fair Coliseum
Fair Park Coliseum (Dallas, Texas)
State Fair Coliseum (Syracuse, New York), former arena of the Syracuse Nationals
Michigan State Fairgrounds Coliseum, hosts the Michigan State Fair
Indiana Farmers Coliseum, formerly known as State Fair Coliseum